York is a former city within Toronto, Ontario, Canada. It is located northwest of Old Toronto, southwest of North York and east of Etobicoke, where it is bounded by the Humber River.

Originally formed as York Township, it encompassed the southern section of York County. It was split several times, creating East York and North York. In 1953, it became part of the Metropolitan Toronto federation. It absorbed several municipalities, including Lambton Mills and Weston and was eventually known as the City of York. In 1998, it was dissolved along with Metro Toronto and its constituent municipalities, amalgamated to form the current City of Toronto.

Today the area is integrated into the multicultural mosaic of Toronto. The area is home today to a number of Portuguese, Jamaican and Latin American neighbourhoods. The former city's census districts had a recorded population of 145,662 in 2016.

History
Teiaiagon, settled by the Iroquois on the eastern bank of the Humber River, where Baby Point is now, was the oldest known settlement on the land that would later become York Township.

York Township was first organized in 1793. Its initial boundaries were the Humber River to the west, in the east by what would become Victoria Park Avenue, and in the north by what would become Steeles Avenue. Etobicoke Township and Scarborough Township were located west and east, respectively, while the townships of Vaughan and Markham bordered on the north, and Lake Ontario on the south, minus the small Town of York. It was incorporated by Canada West in 1850 (Canada West later became Ontario in 1867, due to Confederation) within the new County of York.

York Township was home to one of the original Black communities in the Toronto area, which was populated by many African American fugitive slaves. By 1861, the township had the second-largest Black population in the Toronto area, after St. John's Ward, most of whom lived in York Township West (located west of Yonge Street and north of Bloor Street). The legacy of York's original Black community continues today; as of the 2016 Census, 17 percent of York's population is Black, the largest percentage of Toronto's six former municipalities.

From the period of 1850 onwards, individual villages developed such as Parkdale (1879) and Brockton (1881), which were later annexed into Toronto. The village of Weston was incorporated in 1882. Toronto Junction and East Toronto were incorporated in 1887, both later annexed by Toronto. The village of North Toronto was incorporated in 1889, annexed by Toronto in 1912. Other parts of York were directly annexed by Toronto, such as "The Annex", Riverdale, Rosedale, Seaton and Sunnyside in the 1880s and Bracondale, Deer Park, Wychwood, The Midway and Balmy Beach after 1905.

This pattern of absorption by Toronto ended as the City no longer wanted to take on the servicing costs of new suburbs. The Humewood–Cedarvale neighbourhood was developed in the 1910s to attract development in the growing township. Oakwood Village was also developed during this time. In the 1920s, the character of the township changed, with its southern reaches abutting the city of Toronto taking on a more urban character, compared with the very rural character of the north. The voters of the northern, rural part of York voted to secede, creating the new Township of North York in 1922. This was followed in 1923 by the incorporation of the village of Forest Hill, while the residents of Mount Dennis and Silverthorn voted to remain in York. The remaining two pockets of unincorporated urban development at the north end of the city, were split by the village of North Toronto, which was by then a part of the City of Toronto. Within years, the Province of Ontario saw that this arrangement of having an exclave was impractical, and further subdivided York, creating in 1924 the township of East York out of the eastern pocket.

The Township of York contracted streetcar and bus services from the Toronto Transportation Commission (later became Toronto Transit Commission in 1954), but remained independent from Toronto. During this time, American novelist and journalist Ernest Hemingway resided in the Humewood–Cedarvale community, writing for the Toronto Star.

In 1954, York, along with other municipalities south of Steeles Avenue were severed from York County, forming the new upper-tier government of Metropolitan Toronto. In 1967, it absorbed the town of Weston, and became the Borough of York, later known as the City of York. (The map shows this area in red). York was dissolved on 1 January 1998 and its functions amalgamated into the new City of Toronto. Its former council and administrative building, York Civic Centre, is located at 2700 Eglinton Avenue West, between Black Creek Drive and Keele Street, used for courts and other functions. The Etobicoke-York Community Council of Toronto administers minor responsibilities within the limits of York and Etobicoke.

Neighbourhoods
There are several distinct neighbourhoods in the former city, including the former municipality of Weston, which retains its own main street, Weston Road, and several street names duplicated in other districts of Toronto.

North and west of Oakwood Village is the Fairbank community. Silverthorn is west of Fairbank. Silverthorn (and Fairbank) is described as "Toronto's hidden San Francisco" in reference to its "steep streets, staircases, and unusual views of houses built in what must be the hilliest part of the city." This is due to Toronto's topography being shaped by its deep ravines being similar to the hills of San Francisco, especially in Fairbank and Silverthorn.

The Mount Dennis area of Weston was the base for the former campus of Kodak's Canadian operations from 1912 to 2006. While most of the buildings were demolished, the branch head office has been repurposed for Line 5 Eglinton's Eglinton Maintenance and Storage Facility.

Baby Point, between Jane Street and the Humber River, north of Bloor Street, is situated where the former Iroquoian village of Teiaiagon was located. It was formerly part of the Lambton Mills village within York Township.

Education

Before York was dissolved, the York Board of Education oversaw public secular schools in the former city. Since 1998, the district has been administered by the four Toronto boards:

 Conseil scolaire catholique MonAvenir (CSCM) 
 Conseil scolaire Viamonde (CSV), 
 Toronto Catholic District School Board (TCDSB)
 Toronto District School Board (TDSB)

CSV and TDSB operate as secular public school boards, the former operating French first language institution, whereas the latter operates English first-language institutions (although it does offer French immersion). The other two school boards, CSCM and TCDSB, operate as public Roman Catholic separate school boards, the former operating French first-language separate schools, the latter operating English first-language separate schools.

The TDSB school board operates several institutions that offer primary and secondary education. Secondary schools in York that are operated by TDSB include:

 Forest Hill Collegiate Institute
 Frank Oke Secondary School
 George Harvey Collegiate Institute
 Oakwood Collegiate Institute
 Runnymede Collegiate Institute
 Weston Collegiate Institute
 York Memorial Collegiate Institute

TDSB formerly operated another secondary school in York, Vaughan Road Academy. Opened in 1927, the secondary school was York's first but was closed on its 90th anniversary in 2017 due to its lack of student population resulting from students in the local catchment area attending other nearby secondary schools. Vaughan Road Academy is repurposed as a temporary elementary school for students in the Yonge and Davisville area in Midtown Toronto since the 2018–19 school year to accommodate the construction of a new school building.

TCDSB operates one secondary school in York, St. Oscar Romero Catholic Secondary School. Neither CSCM nor CSV operate a secondary school in York.

Infrastructure

Public library system

Before 1997, the city operated its own library system, the York Public Library. York Public Library was merged with the other library systems of the new City of Toronto to form the new Toronto Public Library (TPL). TPL operates several branches within the district.

York's first public library was the Mount Dennis branch, which operated out of rented premises from 1923. In 1945, the Township of York Public Library Board was established, and proceeded to build three new library buildings that opened in 1951, including the Jane/Dundas library, Main Library (Eglinton Avenue one block east of Dufferin Street), and the Mount Dennis Library. The Main Library was later renamed after York Public Library head librarian Maria Shchuka and was later rebuilt in 2003. The Oakwood Village branch was York's newest library; opening in 1996.

Public transit

York operated its own bus and streetcar service, until it was absorbed by the Toronto Transit Commission. Today, the area is served by the Toronto Transit Commission's buses, streetcar, and subway system.Of the Toronto subway system, only the Heath Street exit of St. Clair West station on Line 1 Yonge–University is in the former city of York as Eglinton West station is completely within Old Toronto. The Rogers Road streetcar line served the namesake street as well.

Line 5 Eglinton

The TTC once had plans to construct the Eglinton West subway line along Eglinton Avenue. It began construction in 1994. However, it was cancelled in 1995 under Ontario premier Mike Harris and there had been no serious discussion about reviving the line until 2007, when Line 5 Eglinton (then known as the Eglinton Crosstown LRT) was proposed as part of David Miller's Transit City.

When Rob Ford became mayor in 2010, he immediately announced the cancellation of Transit City. However, city council spared a few lines, including the Eglinton Crosstown LRT, from cancellation, despite Ford's objections.

Since 2013, the new LRT has been under construction and is expected to be opened in 2023.

GO Transit

The Weston GO Station along the Kitchener line is the only GO Transit train station and Union Pearson Express train station in the district. There are also plans to construct the Caledonia GO Station along the Barrie line, which would connect with Line 5's Caledonia station, along with the Mount Dennis GO Station along the Kitchener line to connect with Line 5's Mount Dennis station.

Politics
The community was first organized as a township in 1793, but not incorporated until 1850. The township was initially a township under the County of York until 1954. In 1954, York was formally severed from the county, along with other municipalities situated south of Steeles Avenue to form the upper-tier government of Metropolitan Toronto. In 1967, the township was formally made into a borough of Metropolitan Toronto, and later a city in 1983. In 1997, York, along with the remaining municipalities of Metropolitan Toronto were formally amalgamated to form the new City of Toronto. Today,  residents now vote for the Mayor of Toronto, as well as councillors of Toronto City Council. Federally and provincially, eligible residents of York are also able to vote for members of the Parliament of Canada and the Legislative Assembly of Ontario.

Reeves
Prior to York's amalgamation with Toronto, York operated its own municipal council, with a mayor heading York's council. Prior to the municipality's incorporation as a borough, the chief magistrate of the council was referred to as a reeve. The following individuals served as the reeves of the Township of York:

Franklin Jackes (1850–1851) – first reeve
 William James (1852–1860)
 William Tyrrell (1860–1864) – architect, later first reeve of Weston
Bartholomew Bull, Jr. (1865–1872)
 William Tyrell (1873–1878) – second tenure
Henry Duncan (1879–1886)
Henry Frankland (1887)
A.L. Wilson (1888–1889)
Simon Thomas Humberstone (1890–1894)
William James Hill (1894–1897) – later MPP for York West
Henry Duncan (1898–1902) – second tenure
William Sylvester (1903–1904)
George Syme (1905) 
 George Stewart Henry (1906–1910) – later MPP for York East and Premier of Ontario
John T. Watson (1911–1912)
George Syme (1913–1914) – second tenure
Thomas Griffiths (1915–1918)
Frederick H. Miller (1919–1922)
W.S. Jury (1923)
William M. Graham (1924–1927)
Ernest C. Westbury (1928–1929)
W.J. Gilbert Dean (1930–1931)
A.J.B. Gray (1932–1933)
R.J. Stuart (1934–1935)
Wesley Marsh Magwood (1936–1937)
F.J. MacRae (1938–1946)
Charles J. McMaster (1947–1948)
William George Beech (1949–1951) – later MPP for York South
Frederick W. Hall (1952–1956) – was reeve when Metropolitan Toronto was created, with York as a member municipality. Subsequently, became chairman of the Metro Licensing Committee. Hall was later tried on charges of municipal corruption for allegedly accepting bribes for building permits during his tenure as reeve.
Christopher Alexander Tonks (1957–1960) - focus of a scandal after he was accused of conflict of interest for voting for a by-law that allowed him to purchase property from the township. Unseated by a court order after a judicial probe but then reinstated on appeal.
Frederick Charles Taylor (1961) - Owner of a construction firm, he was elected on a reform agenda after allegations of corruption against York Township council, having first demanded a judicial probe of the township in 1956. Died in office.
Walter Saunders (1962) - Previously Councillor for Ward 2, council voted Saunders in as reeve in January 1962, following the death of Reeve Taylor. A travel agent by profession, Saunders had run for reeve in previous general elections but had not been successful.
John Lister (Jack) Mould (1963–1966) - ran against former reeve Chris Tonks and was elected by 44 votes, after a recount. Mould was York's last reeve and would be its first mayor. Ran for the position of Metropolitan Toronto Chairman in July 1969 but was forced to withdraw from the contest after Member of Parliament Ralph Cowan accused him of tax evasion.

Mayors
The following individuals served as York's mayor:

John Lister (Jack) Mould (1966–1969) 
Philip White (1970–1978)
Gayle Christie (1978–1982)
Alan Tonks (1982–1988) – resigned to become Metro Chairman, later MP for York South
Fergus Brown (1988–1994)
Frances Nunziata (1994–1997)

The following individual served as the Deputy Mayor of York:
 Joe Mihevc (1991–1997)

Board of Control
The Board of Control was created in 1966 and abolished in 1988. The following individuals served as on the Board of Control:

York's two Controllers also sat on Metro Council.

Names in boldface indicate Controllers that were or became Mayor of York in other years. Italics indicate those who only sat on the Board of Control as mayor.

X = elected as Controller
A = appointed Controller to fill a vacancy
M = sitting as Reeve or Mayor

*Brown served as mayor from 1988 to 1994

See also

List of neighbourhoods in York
History of neighbourhoods in Toronto

Notes

References

Bibliography

External links

 City of Toronto

Black Canadian culture in Toronto
Black Canadian settlements
Former municipalities in Toronto
Former cities in Ontario
Metropolitan Toronto
Neighbourhoods in Toronto
Populated places disestablished in 1998
1998 disestablishments in Ontario